Anton Blasbichler (born 18 February 1972) was an Italian luger who has competed since 1989. A natural track luger, he won nine medals at the FIL World Luge Natural Track Championships with four golds (Singles: 2001, 2005, Team: 2003, 2009, 2011), one silver (Singles: 1996), and three bronzes (Singles: 1998, 1996, Team: 2005).

At the FIL European Luge Natural Track Championships, Blasbichler won four medals in the men's singles event with two golds (1993, 1999), a silver (2008), and a bronze (2010.

References
 
 Natural track European Championships results 1970–2006.
 Natural track World Championships results: 1979–2007

External links

 

1972 births
Italian lugers
Italian male lugers
Living people
Lugers of Gruppo Sportivo Esercito
People from Rodeneck
Sportspeople from Südtirol